Aino Station (愛野駅, Aino-eki) is a train station located in Aino-machi, Isahaya, Nagasaki Prefecture. The station is serviced by Shimabara Railway and is a part of the Shimabara Railway Line.

Lines 
The train station is serving for the Shimabara Railway Line with the local and express trains stop at the station.

Platforms 
Aino Station contains two side platforms with two tracks, both served for the Shimabara Railway Line.

Adjacent stations 

|-
|colspan=5 style="text-align:center;" |Shimabara Railway

See also 
 List of railway stations in Japan

References

External links 
 

Railway stations in Japan opened in 1911
Railway stations in Nagasaki Prefecture
Stations of Shimabara Railway